The 2022 Kansas State Treasurer election took place on November 8, 2022, to elect the next Kansas State Treasurer. Incumbent Democrat Lynn Rogers was appointed on January 2, 2021, after his predecessor, Jake LaTurner, resigned after being elected to Congress. Republican Steven Johnson defeated Rogers in the general election.

Democratic primary

Candidates

Nominee
Lynn Rogers, incumbent state treasurer, former lieutenant governor (2019–2021)

Results

Republican primary

Candidates

Nominee
Steven Johnson, state representative from the 108th district (2011–)

Eliminated in primary
Caryn Tyson, state senator from the 12th district (2013–) and candidate for Kansas's 2nd congressional district in 2018

Withdrew
Michael Austin, economist and former advisor to governor Sam Brownback
Sara Hart Weir, former CEO of the National Down Syndrome Society and candidate for Kansas's 3rd congressional district in 2020

Polling

Results 
Because the race was so close, no winner was declared for over two weeks. Under a law passed in 2022, because the margin between the candidates was below 1%, a recount was automatically triggered. The recount affirmed Johnson's narrow victory and Tyson conceded the race on August 19, 17 days after the primary.

Libertarian convention

Nominee
Steve Roberts, a former member of the Kansas Board of Education and Republican candidate for U.S. Senate in 2020

Notes

References

External links
Official campaign websites
Steven Johnson (R) for State Treasurer
Lynn Rogers (D) for State Treasurer

State Treasurer
Kansas
Kansas State Treasurer elections